James Landis may refer to:

 James P. Landis (1843–1924), American soldier and Medal of Honor recipient
 James M. Landis (1899–1964), American academic, government official and legal adviser
 James Nobel Landis (1899–1989), American power engineer, founding member of the National Academy of Engineering
 James Landis (director) (1926–1991), American film director in the 1960s
 Jim Landis (1934–2017), American baseball player
 J. D. Landis (James David Landis, born 1942), American author